Maciej Twarowski (born 13 March 2001) is a Polish professional footballer who plays as a forward for Wieczysta Kraków, on loan from Jagiellonia Białystok.

Career
On 8 August 2019, Twarowski was loaned out to Olimpia Grudziądz from Jagiellonia Białystok for the rest of 2019. After returning to his maiden club, he mostly appeared for Jagiellonia's reserves team, before leaving on loan yet again on 22 February 2023, this time joining III liga side Wieczysta Kraków.

References

External links

2001 births
Living people
Polish footballers
Poland youth international footballers
Association football forwards
Jagiellonia Białystok players
Olimpia Grudziądz players
Wieczysta Kraków players
Ekstraklasa players
I liga players
III liga players